Grass Cay is an island of the United States Virgin Islands.

It is located between St. Thomas and St. John. It is  approximately 1.6 miles long by ⅛ mile wide. There is no permanent human habitation.

References

Islands of the United States Virgin Islands